"Crab Rave" is a song by Irish DJ and music producer Noisestorm. Canadian record label Monstercat released it on 1 April 2018.

The song was originally released as part of the compilation album Monstercat Instinct Vol. 1, released 15 June 2018. It was later featured as part of Monstercat's Best of 2018 compilation album, released on 14 December 2018. It peaked at #14 on Billboards Dance/Electronic Songs chart.

Background and release
On 1 April 2018, the song was released as a digital download on international digital stores through Canadian record label Monstercat, as well as being released through various music streaming services. "Crab Rave" was featured on the compilation album titled Monstercat Instinct Vol. 1 released on 15 June 2018. The song was later featured on the yearly best-of compilation album titled Monstercat – Best Of 2018 released on 14 December 2018.

In 2015, Epic Games launched Unreal Dev Grants, a $5 million development fund aiming to provide grants to creative projects using Unreal Engine 4. In November 2018, Epic announced that it would award a further $800,000 to more than 30 individuals and teams, including O'Broin for his efforts in creating the music video for "Crab Rave", featuring thousands of computer-generated dancing crabs.

On 1 April 2019, Czech-based indie studio Beat Games announced that "Crab Rave" was to be released onto their virtual reality rhythm game Beat Saber. The song was intentionally released on April Fools' Day to celebrate the first anniversary of the song's original release.

Reception
The song marked the first appearance of O'Broin in the Billboard charts, with the song debuting at number 36 on the "Hot Dance/Electronic Songs" category. The song gained 1 million (U.S) online streams, in the week ending 22 November. The song has since become the second most popular video across both of Monstercat's YouTube channels, surpassing Monstercat: Instinct's second most popular video by 13 times. , the music video has gained over 200 million views on the "Monstercat: Instinct" YouTube channel.

On 22 January 2019, it was revealed that the song won Best Original Track (Solo) in the Tropical House & Commercial Deep House category on the Best of 2018 by the r/EDM subreddit with 226 participants.

Internet meme

"Crab Rave" was initially released as a small April Fool's Day joke, although it soon gained popularity after becoming an Internet meme due to the music video's uplifting theme and dancing crabs.

In an interview with Suzana Palyan of Billboard, O'Broin expressed his appreciation for its growing popularity, writing "It's incredibly cool to see people enjoying it for the humour and video, as well as for the music itself. I really didn't anticipate the wave of new listeners and the plethora of memes based on the original; it's very fun to see the new creative variations being made every day." The music video was developed by O'Broin using the program Unreal Engine.

O'Broin has further expressed his gratitude with the song's popularity, stating that he never expected the song to become so popular and for it to become an Internet meme, writing "Honestly, I had no idea. It just happened – and the cool thing is it happened completely by itself. I just put it out as a funny video and whoever made the 'Obama is Gone' meme kind of kicked everything off. It's fun to go around and read the latest comments because people are always making new versions of the meme and progressing it. I definitely didn't expect it."

Crab Champions
In 2019, Noisestorm announced a video game, Crab Champions, developed solely by O'Broin. The game is to be cross-genre, with elements of the third-person shooter, 3D platformer, racing game and 3D fighting game, and it is slated to be released on Microsoft Windows. O'Broin stated that if the game will initially perform well on Microsoft Windows, there's a chance it will get ported onto consoles. The game, while first teased on April First and believed to be an April Fool's joke, was later clarified to be a serious announcement, drawing in anticipation. The game was initially announced with an early access release date of 20 August 2020, which was delayed beyond November 2020.

In other media
"Crab Rave" was referenced in the first-person shooter Battlefield V in the multiplayer map Wake Island, based on its real-life counterpart. A tribute easter egg dedicated to fans of the Battlefield franchise featured a remix of the Battlefield theme in the style of "Crab Rave". To unlock the easter egg, players must find several crabs across the island, scurrying off if the player approaches. If the player approaches enough crabs, the player can access a pair of headphones found on the map that allows them to hear a message in morse code from a radio station. Decoding the message reveals to several coordinates around Wake Island and going to these would be the location of vinyl records, which each play the themes of previous Battlefield games. If enough vinyl records are collected, a rave consisting of dancing crabs will dance to a remix of the Battlefield theme.

Continuing the tradition of events occurring on April Fools' Day, 2019 saw virtual reality rhythm game Beat Saber add the song as playable DLC for free. The map was noted for its difficulty, and later in 2019, a new map of the song was added to the game, this time in 360 Degrees.

In July 2019, a leak for the free-to-play game Fortnite Battle Royale revealed a dance emote titled "Crabby" was being added to the game. It was noted by a Dot Esports editor that it was likely inspired by "Crab Rave" and was added to the game because of the song's increasingly popular music video.

In April 2021, Titan Forge Games announced a collaboration with Monstercat to add content to Smite based on multiple Monstercat artists, including Noisestorm. The character Khepri, the Ancient Egyptian scarab god, was given a "Crab Rave"-inspired skin.

Following the death of Elizabeth II in September 2022, Crab Rave was shared across Twitter, Tumblr, and Reddit.

Charts

Weekly charts

Year-end charts

Certifications

Release history

References

2018 songs
2018 singles
Electronic songs
Monstercat singles
House music songs
Tropical house songs
Internet memes introduced in 2018
Crabs in culture